Walk the Talk may refer to:

 Walk the Talk EP , a 2012 EP by William Beckett
 Walk the Talk (film), a 2001 Australian film